Google Travel, formerly Google Trips, is a trip planner service developed by Google for the web. It was originally launched as a mobile app on September 19, 2016, for Android and iOS, which was shut down on August 5th, 2019. The features are part of the Google Travel website which also includes Google Flights and Google Hotel Search.

History
The mobile app launched on September 19, 2016, for Android and iOS. Google announced in May 2019 of providing desktop functionality to trip planning and integrating some of the trip planning features within Google Maps. In June 2019, Google announced that support for Google Trips would end on August 5, 2019. Instead, users could use the new Google Travel website to plan their trips.

Features
In order to use the mobile app, a Google account was required. Google Travel allows users to plan for upcoming trips with summarizing info about the user's destination in several categories such as day plans, reservations, and things to do. The discontinued app launched with complete day guides to more than 200 major cities. The mobile app also facilitated locating flight, hotel, car, and restaurant reservations for the trip based on emails from the user's Gmail.

References

External links

Google software
2016 software